The Indian Ocean oriental sweetlips (Plectorhinchus vittatus), also known as the oriental sweetlips or oriental blubberlips, is a species of marine ray-finned fish, a sweetlips belonging to the subfamily Plectorhinchinae, one of two subfamilies in the family Haemulidae, the grunts. It is native to the Indian Ocean and the western Pacific Ocean.

Description
The Indian Ocean oriental sweetlips has fleshy lips which become greatly swollen as the fish ages. There are 6 pores on its chin but there is no median pit. The dorsal fin contains 12–14 spines and 16–20 soft rays while the anal fin has 3 spines and 7–8 soft rays. The adults of this species have a basic light greyish colour of which fades to white on the abdomen. It has alternating black and white stripes. the black stripes normally broader on the upper body, the fins are yellow, as are the snout and forehead, The dorsal, anal and caudal fins are marked with blackish spots. The subadults have wide stripes on their head, body and fins while the juveniles have black blotches and spots that are joined but which slowly split into longitudinal stripes as they grow, the pectoral fins of juveniles are black.

Distribution
The Indian Ocean oriental sweetlips is found in the Indo-Pacific region. Its range extends from East Africa from Djibouti to South Africa, Madagascar, the Seychelles and Mascarene Islands, the Gulf of Mannar in India and the Andaman and Nicobar Islands east to Micronesia, Samoa, the Society Islands and Guam. It can alsdo be found from Western Australia to Papua New Guinea and New Caledonia.

Habitat and biology
It is found singly or in small aggregations and is tends to be nocturnal. The juveniles may be found in tidepools and in beds of  sea grass. It forages at night feeding on small invertebrates such crustaceans, gastropods or annelids, as well as smaller fishes. It is an oviparous species which spawns as distinct pairs.

Systematics
The Indian Ocean oriental sweetlips was first formally described as Perca vittata in 1758 by Carl Linnaeus in the 10th edition of the Systema Naturae with no type locality given. The specific name, vittatus means "banded", a reference to the bold striped pattern of adults. Some authorities regard Bloch's Plectorhinchus orientalis'' as a separate species rather than a synonym of P. vittatus''.

Utilisation
The Indian Ocean oriental sweetlips is caught by fisheries in much of its range, and is caught using hand nets and by spear fishing and the catch is sold fresh or a small amount of it is preserved as salted fish. It is being trialled for aquaculture. It is an infrequently traded species in the aquarium trade.

References

 

Indian Ocean oriental sweetlips
Fish of Palau
Fish described in 1758
Taxa named by Carl Linnaeus